Kesmetepe is a town (belde) and municipality in the Besni District, Adıyaman Province, Turkey. Its population is 1,582 (2021).

The settlements of Çakmak and İncekoz are attached to the village. Çakmak is populated by Kurds of the Reşwan tribe.

References

Towns in Turkey
Populated places in Adıyaman Province
Besni District
Kurdish settlements in Adıyaman Province